Calochilus gracillimus, commonly known as the slender beard orchid or late beard orchid, is a species of orchid endemic to eastern Australia. It has a single dark green leaf with a reddish base and up to nine green flowers with red stripes and a reddish, brownish or purplish "beard".

Description
The leaf is fully developed when the first flower opens. The lateral sepals are a similar length but narrower. The column has two purple coloured "eyes" joined by a faint ridge. Flowering occurs from November to January.

Taxonomy and naming
Calochilus gracillimus was first formally described in 1943 by Montague Rupp and the description was published in The Victorian Naturalist from a specimen collected near Woy Woy. The specific epithet (gracillimus) is a Latin word meaning "slenderest". Rupp noted that the specific epithet "is in particular allusion to the labellum, but is almost equally applicable to the whole flower".

Distribution and habitat
The slender beard orchid grows on ridges and slopes in forest and woodland. It occurs in New South Wales north from Woodford and in southeastern Queensland.

References

gracillimus
Endemic orchids of Australia
Orchids of New South Wales
Orchids of Queensland
Plants described in 1943